A music box (American English) or musical box (British English) is an automatic musical instrument in a box that produces musical notes by using a set of pins placed on a revolving cylinder or disc to pluck the tuned teeth (or lamellae) of a steel comb. The popular device best known today as a "music box" developed from musical snuff boxes of the 18th century and were originally called carillons à musique (French for "chimes of music"). Some of the more complex boxes also contain a tiny drum and/or bells in addition to the metal comb.

History

The Symphonium company started business in 1885 as the first manufacturers of disc-playing music boxes. Two of the founders of the company, Gustave Brachhausen and Paul Riessner, left to set up a new firm, Polyphon, in direct competition with their original business and their third partner, Oscar Paul Lochmann. Following the establishment of the Original Musikwerke Paul Lochmann in 1900, the founding Symphonion business continued until 1909.

According to the Victoria Museums in Australia, "The Symphonion is notable for the enormous diversity of types, styles, and models produced... No other disc-playing musical box exists in so many varieties. The company also pioneered the use of electric motors... the first model fitted with an electric motor being advertised in 1900. The company moved into the piano-orchestrion business and made both disc-operated and barrel-playing models, player-pianos, and phonographs."

Meanwhile, Polyphon expanded to America, where Brachhausen established the Regina Company. Regina was a spectacular success. It eventually reinvented itself as a maker of vacuums and steam cleaners.

In the heyday of the music box, some variations were as tall as a grandfather clock and all used interchangeable large disks to play different sets of tunes. These were spring-wound and driven and both had a bell-like sound. The machines were often made in England, Italy, and the US, with additional disks made in Switzerland, Austria, and Prussia. Early "juke-box" pay versions of them existed in public places. Marsh's free Museum and curio shop in Long Beach, Washington (US) has several still-working versions of them on public display. The Musical Museum, Brentford, London has a number of machines. The Morris Museum in Morristown, New Jersey, USA has a notable collection, including interactive exhibits. In addition to video and audio footage of each piece, the actual instruments are demonstrated for the public daily on a rotational basis.

Timeline

9th century: In Baghdad, the Banū Mūsā brothers, a trio of Persian inventors, produced "the earliest known mechanical musical instrument", in this case a hydropowered organ which played interchangeable cylinders automatically, which they described in their Book of Ingenious Devices. According to Charles B. Fowler, this "cylinder with raised pins on the surface remained the basic device to produce and reproduce music mechanically until the second half of the nineteenth century."

Early 13th century: In Flanders, an ingenious bell ringer invents a cylinder with pins which operates cams, which then hit the bells.

1598: Flemish clockmaker Nicholas Vallin produces a wall-mounted clock which has a pinned barrel playing on multiple tuned bells mounted in the superstructure. The barrel can be programmed, as the pins can be separately placed in the holes provided on the surface of the barrel.

1665: Ahasuerus Fromanteel in London makes a table clock which has quarter striking and musical work on multiple bells operated by a pinned barrel. These barrels can be changed for those playing different tunes.

1772: A watch is made by one Ransonet at Nancy, France which has a pinned drum playing music not on bells but on tuned steel prongs arranged vertically.

1796: Antoine Favre-Salomon, a clockmaker from Geneva replaces the stack of bells by a comb with multiple pre-tuned metallic notes in order to reduce space. Together with a horizontally placed pinned barrel, this produces more varied and complex sounds. One of these first music boxes is now displayed at the Shanghai Gallery of Antique Music Boxes and Automata in Pudong's Oriental Art Center.

1877: Thomas Edison invents the phonograph, which has important consequences for the musical-box industry, especially around the end of the century.

In March 2016, the band Wintergatan released a video of their homemade Marble Machine which took 14 months to make and played in any key using a 3,000-piece wooden construction fueled by 2,000 marbles. Band member Martin Molin used a hand crank to mobilize the marbles, which then created various noises on a vibraphone and other installed musical elements.

In 2019, Tevofy Technology Ltd., based in Taiwan, released the first app-controlled mechanical music box called the Muro Box, an abbreviation of "Music Robot in a Box". Unlike traditional music boxes, people do not need to punch holes to compose songs on a paper-strip music box, and there is no minimum order for making customized music box movement to play a selected song.

Repertoire
In 1974–1975, German composer Karlheinz Stockhausen composed Tierkreis, a set of twelve pieces on the signs of the zodiac, for twelve music boxes.

See also
Barrel organ
Cuckoo clock
Graphophone
Musical clock
Player piano
Singing bird box
Shanghai Gallery of Antique Music Boxes and Automata
The Musical Museum, Brentford, London, England has several examples by makers including Nicole Frères, Regina and Popper which may be seen and heard.

References

Further reading
 Bahl, Gilbert. Music Boxes: The Collector's Guide to Selecting, Restoring and Enjoying New and Vintage Music Boxes. Philadelphia, Pennsylvania: Running Press, 1993.
 Bowers, Q. David. Encyclopedia of Automatic Musical Instruments. . Lanham, Maryland: Vestal Press, Inc., 1972.
 Diagram Group. Musical Instruments of the World. New York: Facts on File, 1976.
 Ganske, Sharon. Making Marvelous Music Boxes. New York: Sterling Publishing Company, 1997.
 Greenhow, Jean. Making Musical Miniatures. London: B T Batsford, 1979.
 Hoke, Helen, and John Hoke. Music Boxes, Their Lore and Lure. New York: Hawthorn Books, 1957.
 
 Ord-Hume, Arthur W. J. G. The Musical Box: A Guide for Collectors. . Atglen, Pennsylvania: Schiffer Publishing Ltd., 1995.
 Reblitz, Arthur A. The Golden Age of Automatic Musical Instruments. . Woodsville, New Hampshire: Mechanical Music Press, 2001.
 Reblitz, Arthur A., Q. David Bowers. Treasures of Mechanical Music. . New York: The Vestal Press, 1981.
 Sadie, Stanley. ed. "Musical Box". The New Grove Dictionary of Music and Musicians. . MacMillan. 1980. Vol 12. P. 814.
 Smithsonian Institution. History of Music Machines. . New York: Drake Publishers, 1975.
 Templeton, Alec, as told to Rachael Bail Baumel. Alec Templeton's Music Boxes. New York: Wilfred Funk, 1958.

External links

 
 Performance of Listen Thing and Pandora's Secret on a punched paper-tape controlled music box (video)
 Musical Box Society International – Glossary of Terms
 Music Box Maniacs – a website dedicated to paper strip punch card music boxes

Audio of historical music boxes
 Polyphon Music Box, made app. 1850
 Mira Music Box – Sammy 1903
 Mechanical Music Box – Auld Lang Syne
 Mechanical Music from Phonogrammarchiv of the Austrian Academy of Sciences
 LP vinyl record: "The Concert Regina Music Box and the Symphonium" (1977, Nostalgia Repertoire Records – Sonic Arts Corporation, 665 Harrison Street, San Francisco Ca. 94107, Curator: Leo de Gar Kulka, Record No. RR 4771 Stereo.)

Comb lamellophones
European musical instruments
Box
Articles containing video clips